The Arkansas School for Mathematics, Sciences, and the Arts (ASMSA) is a public residential high school located in Hot Springs, Arkansas that serves sophomores, juniors, and seniors. It is a part of the University of Arkansas administrative system and a member of the NCSSSMST. The school was originally known as The Arkansas School for Mathematics and Sciences (abbreviated ASMS). The school is accredited by AdvancED.

School description
Academically, the school is modeled after the North Carolina School of Science and Mathematics. Studies focus on mathematics, computer science, science, and humanities. All courses are taught at the Honors level or above. ASMSA offers approximately 50 courses for university credit through a partnership with the University of Arkansas at Fort Smith and other advanced high school courses for elective credit.  ASMSA graduates finish their experience having earned an average of 50 college credit hours. ASMSA has an arts program, which was added in 2004 by the state legislature. Though not yet at the depth of the school's STEM-based programs, investment has been made in recent years to enhance the studio and digital arts experiences.  Since 2015, the school has added three full-time faculty members in studio art and music to achieve this goal.

The school was created in 1991 with backing from then-Governor Bill Clinton. The charter class enrolled as juniors in 1993 and graduated in 1995.

Prospective students apply during the spring of their sophomore or freshman year and submit application forms, grade transcripts, SAT or ACT results, and three letters of recommendation. Students can enter via normal admissions as a junior or enter through early admissions as a sophomore. Additionally, some students can repeat their junior year of high school at ASMSA if they choose to apply their current junior year, called Super Juniors.

Most of the campus of the school itself is located in the former St. Joseph's Catholic Hospital in the William Jefferson Clinton Presidential Park in the historic district of Hot Springs, and it is surrounded on three sides by the Hot Springs National Park.

All faculty have at least a master's degree in their field, and 48% have a Ph.D. or other terminal degree in their field. Notable professors at the school have included Don Baker, who was a Foreign Service Officer for the United States Department of State; Mrs. Melanie Nichols, who has served on several AP committees and has been active in the math education community, was a mathematics teacher at the school before becoming Dean of Academic Affairs in 2006; Brian Monson, who has previously taught at the University of Tulsa and the Oklahoma School of Science and Mathematics, is chair of the science department and teaches AP Physics C, Optics, and Folk Music and Acoustics, and plays the harmonica and the mandolin; and Charlie Cole Chaffin, who was a chemistry teacher at the school, was a member of the Arkansas State Senate.

Several former and current teachers at the school also instruct during the summer at the Arkansas Governor's School. The current Director of the school is Corey Alderdice.

A new building called the Creativity and Innovation Complex was constructed and added to the campus in 2019. The first floor will be named the Dan Fredinburg Technology Center in memory of ASMSA Class of 1999 alumnus Dan Fredinburg.

Capstone
ASMSA students have many projects and activities that fill their time. One of the school's trademarks is Capstone (formerly called FIRM), a longitudinal research project which culminates in the school's participation in the Intel Science and Engineering Fair, Senior Research Symposium, or Arts Capstone, depending on the project. Students select a research topic at the start of their spring semester as a junior and will continue to research this project for the next fourteen months through a class titled Fundamentals in Research Methods. This project ends during Science Fair week, which is generally in late February. ASMSA competes as its own region in the state competition because of the number of projects it produces every year—often a hundred or more. Projects sometimes culminate with substantial monetary awards, governmental recognition, and publication in local, statewide, regional, and nationwide news outlets.

Student life

Student involvement at ASMSA is present, and there are a plethora of clubs, associations, and groups.  The cultural awareness ADAPT Club shares and discusses different heritages, often with cultural foods, games, movies, stories, and music for the members as well as the general student body to enjoy, accept, and appreciate. There is also the SGA (Student Government Association) for those students exhibiting leadership in the school environment and policy. Other clubs, associations, and groups include the Dolphin Dance Team, Model UN, Beta, Delta, National Honor Society, FBLA, Youth Branch of the National Association for the Advancement of Science, Technology, Medicine, Music, and Liberal Arts (NAASTMML), SLAMT Sports Alliance, Community Leaders (CLs), Student Ambassadors, Admissions Delegates, Peer Mentors and many more.

See also
 Alabama School of Mathematics and Science
 Carol Martin Gatton Academy of Mathematics and Science in Kentucky
 Craft Academy for Excellence in Science and Mathematics
 Illinois Mathematics and Science Academy
 Indiana Academy for Science, Mathematics, and Humanities
 Kansas Academy of Mathematics and Science
 Louisiana School for Math, Science, and the Arts
 Maine School of Science and Mathematics 
 Mississippi School for Mathematics and Science
 North Carolina School of Science and Mathematics
 Oklahoma School of Science and Mathematics
 South Carolina Governor's School for Science and Mathematics
 Texas Academy of Mathematics and Science

References

External links
Arkansas School for Mathematics, Sciences, and the Arts

1991 establishments in Arkansas
Educational institutions established in 1991
Public high schools in Arkansas
NCSSS schools
Schools in Garland County, Arkansas
Magnet schools in Arkansas
Buildings and structures in Hot Springs, Arkansas
Public boarding schools in the United States
Boarding schools in Arkansas